Indians in Madagascar form a community of roughly 25,000 individuals according to the statistics of India's Ministry of External Affairs; other estimates of their population range from 15,000 to 30,000. Among them are 867 non-resident Indians, with the rest being locally born descendants of early immigrants. They form a minority ethnic group in Madagascar.

History
By the 1780s, a community of roughly 200 Indian traders had formed at Mahajanga, a port on the north-west coast of Madagascar, near Bombetoka Bay at the mouth of the Betsiboka River. Confusion arose over their legal status; they often declared themselves to be Malagasy subjects in order to evade the laws against slave-holding or the building of stone houses, both forbidden to British subjects, while their dhows, which they used to transport goods to and from the African mainland, flew French flags. Initial arrivals were mainly Muslim Khojas, Ismailis and Daoudi Bohras, with some Hindus settling later. The 1911 census found 4,480 Indians in the country, making them 21% of the total foreign population and the second-largest foreign population after the French. Following the nationalisation of private businesses in the 1970s, many were compelled to leave; those who remained were largely uneducated, but stayed on and gradually built their businesses. By 2000, they were generally believed to control 50-60% of the country's economy, making them the target of demonstrators during periods of unrest.

See also

Chinese people in Madagascar
Hinduism in Madagascar
Islam in Madagascar
Demographics of Madagascar
India–Madagascar relations

References

Sources

Further reading

Ethnic groups in Madagascar
Malagasy people of Indian descent
Madagascar
Indian diaspora in Africa